Mattias Adelstam (born 7 March 1982) is a retired Swedish footballer who played for many Swedish clubs as a forward, mainly in Superettan. He became the top scorer in Superettan while playing for Ängelholms FF in 2009.

Honours

Individual
Superettan Top Scorer: 2009

References

External links
 
 
 

1982 births
Trelleborgs FF players
Landskrona BoIS players
Allsvenskan players
Superettan players
Swedish men's footballers
Living people
Hammarby Fotboll players
BK Olympic players
Association football forwards
Footballers from Malmö